In sociology, homosociality means same-sex relationships that are not of a romantic or sexual nature, such as friendship, mentorship, or others. Researchers who use the concept mainly do so to explain how men uphold men's dominance in society.

Homosocial was popularized by Eve Kosofsky Sedgwick in her discussion of male homosocial desire. Sedgwick used the term to distinguish from "homosexual" and to connote a form of male bonding often accompanied by fear or hatred of homosexuality. Jean Lipman-Blumen had earlier (1976) defined homosociality as a preference for members of one's own sex – a social rather than a sexual preference.

The opposite of homosocial is heterosocial, describing non-sexual relations with the opposite sex.

Empirical evidence 
In a study presented by Rose, males and females between the ages of 20 and 28 were examined on their evaluations of same- and cross-sex friendships. Results showed a preference for same-sex relationships in both men and women. Cross-sex relationships were evaluated by men and women to be less helpful, and less loyal than same-sex friendships, and friendship formation was found to be different between cross-sex and same-sex relationships as well.

Depending on the culture, and family, and social structures, same-sex preferences have been found to develop between 3 and 9 years old. (LaFreniere, Strayer,& Gauthier, 1984; Jacklin& Maccoby, 1978; Harkness & Super, 1985). LaFreniere, Strayer, and Gauthier (1984) conducted a three-year-long study observing fifteen peer groups between the ages of 1 to 6 years old, 98 boys and 93 girls.  As they looked into sex segregation in childhood, the researchers found that segregation rose with age and that most Western children exhibit these preferences around 3–4 years old. However, in a study by Harkenss and Super, Kenyan children were not found to have sex-preference in playmates until the ages of 6 to 9 years old. Researchers observed 152 Kenyan children in rural settings and found that this change didn't occur until parental expectations and customary duties increased.  "Just when and how such gender segregation appears, is the joint product of the individual and the culturally constructed niche" (Harkness & Super, 1985).

It appears that the social bias towards members of one's own sex can develop early in children. Specifically, studies have found that by the early age of 3 or 4, children prefer members of their own sex to members of the opposite sex (Bussey & Bandura, 1992). That is, young girls favor other females (girls and women) over males (boys and men). The findings are identical for young boys. Moreover, a study done by Carol Martin (1989) found that boys 4.5 years of age expressed significantly more dislike for a girl depicted as a "tomboy" than a boy depicted as a "sissy"; whereas boys 8.5 years of age express more dislike for a boy depicted as a "sissy". This age difference suggests that children as young as 4 prefer their own sex regardless of gender-incongruent behavior. Around the age of 8 however, boys begin to adhere to and appreciate the social expectations for males—devaluing feminine behavior. It has also been shown that children ages 10–12 prefer same-sex socializing. That is, girls favored girls who socialized with other girls and boys liked boys who socialized with other boys.

Sexual orientation 

Homosociality, by definition, implies neither heterosexuality nor homosexuality. For example, a heterosexual male who prefers to socialize with men may be considered a homosocial heterosexual.  The term is often used by feminists to emphasize aspects of solidarity between males. Some feminists also identify a close link between female homosociality, feminism, and lesbian desire, with Audre Lorde stating "the true feminist deals out of a lesbian consciousness whether or not she ever sleeps with women."

Historical uses

Homosociality is a term sometimes used in discussions of the all-male world of knightly life in medieval culture. It is also used for historically largely male occupations such as being a sailor (for example, historian Marcus Rediker uses the term to describe the pirate world). Homosocial relationships are not obliged to be sexual relationships; they are merely same-sex social interactions.

Predominantly homosocial arrangements include:
Single-sex educational institutions
Men's colleges and Women's colleges
Fraternities and sororities
Madrasas
Monasteries
Military (historically exclusively male, although presently both sexes are accepted in some forces)   
Prisons
Yeshivot
Sports club teams, particularly geared toward single-sex membership or to one unique all-male or all-female sport 
Exclusive male clubs or female clubs

Generally, the more polarized the gender roles and restrictive the sexual code, the more homosociality one expects to find in a society.

Study

Feminist theory

Feminist scholars such as Rosabeth Moss Kanter and Heidi Hartmann and others have emphasized the role of male homosociality in perpetuating perceived patterns of male dominance in the workplace. Kanter has explored "metaphorical 'homosocial reproduction' - how men attempt to reproduce their dominant power relations by only uniting with and sharing the same occupational space and privilege with those males" who resemble them - although "subsequent research has suggested some revisions of Kanter's underlying argument...[re] 'homosocial reproduction'". Timothy Laurie has criticized how "homosociality" is used in the sociology of masculinity, noting that "much extant research on [homosociality] retains the premise that men innately seek identification and communication with other men. The mysterious malepolitik is thus privileged over men's relationships to femininity, or women's relationships to masculinity". In terms of specific studies, Karen Gabriel offers a useful mapping of the working of homosociality in the context of India.

Homosocial/sexual

There is further controversy regarding the relationship between homosociality and homosexuality: "how, if at all, male homosociality is connected to male homosexuality is one of the key questions posed by scholars in the field". Eve Kosofsky Sedgwick identifies a continuum between homosociality and homosexuality, going as far as correlating feminism and lesbian desire. This approach has been compared to Adrienne Rich's concept of the "lesbian continuum."

At the same time, Sedgwick "defines male homosociality as a form of male bonding with a characteristic triangular structure. In this triangle, men have intense but nonsexual bonds with other men, and women serve as the conduits through which those bonds are expressed". Sedgwick's analysis of "the love triangle in which two men appear to be competing for a woman's love...develops René Girard's claim that such a triangle may disguise as rivalry what is actually an attraction between men". Girard argued that "the homosexual drift stems logically from the fact that the model/rival is a man", producing at times a "noticeably increased preponderance of the mediator and a gradual obliteration of the [female] object".

Research at the Australian Research Centre in Sex, Health and Society (ARCSHS), La Trobe University, has found that mutual identification over heterosexual activity is often the medium through which male homosocial bonding is enacted.

Bromance 

In popular culture, the word bromance has recently been used to refer to an especially close homosocial yet non-sexual relationship between two men. Bromance is most often used in the case of two heterosexual partners, although there have been prominent celebrity gay-straight bromances (also known as homomances or hobromances). The female equivalent is a womance.

Literary explorations

Eve Sedgwick says, "Shakespeare's Sonnets seem to offer a single, discursive, deeply felt narrative of the dangers and vicissitudes of one male homosocial adventure."

See also

References 

LGBT terminology
Queer theory
LGBT and society
Sociological terminology